Abdul Malek Al Anizan (born 25 February 1989) is a Syrian footballer who plays as a defender for Jableh SC, on loan from Al-Karamah SC and the Syria national team.

Career
Al Anizan was included in Syria's squad for the 2019 AFC Asian Cup in the United Arab Emirates.

Career statistics

International

References

External links
 
 
 

1989 births
Living people
Syrian footballers
Syria international footballers
Syrian expatriate footballers
Association football defenders
Taliya SC players
Al-Jaish Damascus players
Mesaimeer SC players
Qatari Second Division players
2019 AFC Asian Cup players
Expatriate footballers in Qatar
Syrian expatriate sportspeople in Qatar
Syrian Premier League players